Backstay insulators, when used as a pair, are devices which allow for the electrical isolation of a section of wire on a yacht (e.g. the backstay) so that it can be used as an antenna for a single sideband (SSB) radio.

Since these insulators form part of the rigging, not only must they not leak current, but they must also be strong and durable enough not to fail mechanically under the sometimes tough load conditions experienced in sailing.

Manufacturers include Hi-MOD, Norseman-Gibb and Sta-Lok.  Each design is slightly different, but all share the common characteristics of having two attachment points set back-to-back and separated by some insulating material. 

The Hi-MOD system has been designed in such a way that if the insulating material (typically some sort of plastic) were to fail mechanically, the fitting would retain structural integrity, keeping the wire from separating even when it stops functioning as an insulator.

References

Sailboat components
Dielectrics